Erytus may refer to:

Eurytus, the name of several characters in Greek mythology
Erytus (beetle), a genus of beetles in the family Aphodiidae